HD 187123 b is a typical "hot Jupiter" located approximately 150 light-years away in the constellation of Cygnus, orbiting the star HD 187123. It has a mass about half that of Jupiter and it orbits in a very tight, round orbit around the star every three days.

The star has also been monitored for possible transits by the planet, but none was found.

The presence of water has been detected in the atmosphere of HD 187123 b with high confidence.

See also
 HD 187123 c

References

External links
 
 

Cygnus (constellation)
Exoplanets discovered in 1998
Giant planets
Hot Jupiters
Exoplanets detected by radial velocity